The Raciu (in its upper course also: Leaota) is a right tributary of the river Ialomița in Romania. Its source is in the Leaota Mountains. It flows into the Ialomița between Dobrești and Pucheni.

References

Rivers of Romania
Rivers of Dâmbovița County